Antonio della Scala (1362 – 3 September 1388) was Lord of Verona from 1375 until 1387, initially together with his brother Bartolomeo.

Antonio was the illegitimate son of Cansignorio della Scala. At the latter's death, he was associated in the lordship with his brother Bartolomeo. In 1378 he married Samaritana da Polenta, daughter of Guido III da Polenta, lord of Ravenna. He reigned alone after 1381, until 1387, when he was deposed by Gian Galeazzo Visconti, Duke of Milan.

Antonio lived in exile in Ravenna until his death.

Scala, Antonio 1
Scala, Antonio 1
Antonio 1
Lords of Verona
14th-century Italian nobility